Bill McAtee (11 April 1943 – 2008) was an Australian water polo player. He competed in the men's tournament at the 1964 Summer Olympics.

References

1943 births
2008 deaths
Australian male water polo players
Olympic water polo players of Australia
Water polo players at the 1964 Summer Olympics
Place of birth missing